Johan Henrik (Heikki) Kiiskinen (12 May 1868, Iisalmi - 17 November 1915) was a Finnish farmer and politician. He was a member of the Parliament of Finland from 1907 to 1908, representing the Agrarian League.

References

1868 births
1915 deaths
People from Iisalmi
People from Kuopio Province (Grand Duchy of Finland)
Centre Party (Finland) politicians
Members of the Parliament of Finland (1907–08)